Richard Lewer is a Melbourne-based visual artist who works with video and animation, painting, drawing and performance. Lewer has been labelled as a contemporary social realist largely driven by a desire to explain patterns and connections within crime, sport and religion.

Early life and education
Lewer completed a Bachelor of Fine Art at Elam School of Fine Arts at Auckland University from 1989 to 1992. He also holds a Master of Visual Arts, Victorian College of the Arts, from the University of Melbourne, 2000.

Art practice
Lewer is based in Melbourne and exhibits regularly in Australia and New Zealand.

Awards and prizes
Lewer won the Wallace Art Award in 2008 for a painting from a series called Skill, Discipline, Training. 

In 2014, he was the 63rd recipient of the Blake Prize for Religious Art for his media work Worse Luck I’m Still Here. 

Lewer was the winner of the Basil Sellers Art Prize in 2016, with his submission of a series of oil paintings titled 'The Theatre of Sports'.

He was an Archibald Prize finalist in 2017, 2021 and 2022.

Symposia and residencies 
In 2010, he completed an artist's residency with the International Studio & Curatorial Program (ISCP) in Brooklyn, New York.

From  2012 to 2013 he was artist in residence at the Fremantle Arts Centre in Perth. 

In 2014 Lewer was  artist in residence with the Parnngurr Community (Martumili artists), Western desert, Western Australia.

References

1970 births
Living people
Australian artists
People from Hamilton, New Zealand
Blake Prize for Religious Art winners
Archibald Prize finalists